Robert Radosz (born 8 July 1975) is a Polish former cyclist, who rode professionally between 2000 and 2014.

Major results

2000
 1st Overall Bałtyk–Karkonosze Tour
 9th Overall Course de Solidarność et des Champions Olympiques
2001
 2nd Memoriał Andrzeja Trochanowskiego
2003
 1st Stage 8 Bałtyk–Karkonosze Tour
 2nd Memoriał Henryka Łasaka
 5th Szlakiem Walk Majora Hubala
2004
 1st Memoriał Henryka Łasaka
 1st Stage 7 Bałtyk–Karkonosze Tour
 3rd Overall Tour of Małopolska
 6th Memoriał Andrzeja Trochanowskiego
 7th Grand Prix Kooperativa
 8th Overall Course de la Solidarité Olympique
1st Stage 2
2005
 1st Stage 4a Dookoła Mazowsza
 1st Stage 3 Tour of Małopolska
 1st Stage 4b Okolo Slovenska
 1st Stage 7 Tour of Bulgaria
 3rd Puchar Ministra Obrony Narodowej
 5th Neuseen Classics
 7th Overall Szlakiem Grodów Piastowskich
 8th Overall Bałtyk–Karkonosze Tour
 9th Memoriał Andrzeja Trochanowskiego
2006
 1st Overall Course de la Solidarité Olympique
1st Stage 1
 1st Stage 3 Tour of Małopolska
 1st Stage 4 Tour of Bulgaria
 5th Szlakiem Walk Majora Hubala
 6th Overall Dookoła Mazowsza
2007
 1st Overall Tour of Hainan
1st Stages 5 & 7
 3rd Road race, National Road Championships
 4th Overall Szlakiem Grodów Piastowskich
1st Stage 4
 6th Overall Bałtyk–Karkonosze Tour
 7th Overall Course de Solidarność et des Champions Olympiques
2008
 4th Puchar Ministra Obrony Narodowej
 6th Overall Tour of Japan
 7th Overall Tour of Małopolska
 10th Coupe des Carpathes
2009
 2nd Overall Dookoła Mazowsza
 6th Overall Bałtyk–Karkonosze Tour
 6th Overall Tour of Małopolska
 8th Memoriał Andrzeja Trochanowskiego
 8th Memoriał Henryka Łasaka
 9th Overall Course de Solidarność et des Champions Olympiques
 9th Puchar Ministra Obrony Narodowej
2010
 3rd Grand Prix Jasnej Góry
2011
 1st Overall Bałtyk–Karkonosze Tour
1st Stage 5
 1st Overall Dookoła Mazowsza
1st Stage 2
 4th Memoriał Andrzeja Trochanowskiego
 9th Overall Tour of Małopolska
1st Stage 3
2012
 3rd Overall Bałtyk–Karkonosze Tour
1st Stage 8
 3rd Coupe des Carpathes
 6th Overall Tour of Bulgaria
 9th Overall Tour of Małopolska
 9th Overall Dookoła Mazowsza
 9th Puchar Ministra Obrony Narodowej
2013
 2nd Overall Dookoła Mazowsza
1st Stage 4 (TTT)
 8th Puchar Ministra Obrony Narodowej
2014
 6th Visegrad 4 Bicycle Race – GP Slovakia
 8th Coupe des Carpathes
 10th Overall Tour of Estonia

References

External links

1975 births
Living people
Polish male cyclists
People from Sławno
Sportspeople from West Pomeranian Voivodeship